The Webster Hotel is located in New York City. The building was built in 1902 and was added to the National Register of Historic Places on September 7, 1984. It was designed by the architectural firm of Tracy and Swartwout, and built in the Classical Revival style.

It functions today as The Midtown Executive Club, it is also marketed as a hotel to the general public under the name Club Quarters, Midtown.

Famous visitors
Colombian novelist Gabriel García Márquez stayed with his family in the Webster Hotel during a period when he moved from Havana to New York City to work for Cuban press agency Prensa Latina.<ref></ref

The hotel was the first marital home of Franklin and Eleanor Roosevelt while he attended Columbia Law School.

See also
National Register of Historic Places listings in Manhattan from 14th to 59th Streets

References

External links 
 The Midtown Executive Club Official Website
 Club Quarters, Midtown Official Website

Hotel buildings on the National Register of Historic Places in Manhattan
Neoclassical architecture in New York City
Hotel buildings completed in 1902
Hotels in Manhattan
Midtown Manhattan